Adiantum cunninghamii is a maidenhair fern found in New Zealand. The sori are found under the curved leaf margins.

References

cunninghamii
Flora of New Zealand
Taxa named by William Jackson Hooker